Habeeb Zain Arif (born in Hyderabad, India) is an Indian politician and the present Corporator of Greater Hyderabad Municipal Corporation, MIM.

In the media
Habeeb Zain Arif is one of the most common political faces among news channels & press. He is famous for the ' MIM Supporter Cries for the release of Akbaruddin Owaisi ' case which had garnered a lot of media attention during the period of Akbaruddin Owaisi's jail term.

References

1973 births
Living people
Politicians from Hyderabad, India